KJZZ (91.5 FM, "K Jazz") is a National Public Radio member station in Phoenix, Arizona.  Owned by Rio Salado College, it operates from studios on the college's campus in Tempe.  KJZZ airs a format of NPR, jazz, and blues. KJZZ is sister station to the area's main classical music station, KBAQ.

History
The station signed on February 22, 1951, broadcasting from the campus of Phoenix College, then an arm of the Phoenix Union High School District, as KFCA. It was Phoenix's first FM radio station, broadcasting with 10 watts on 88.5 MHz. It became a part of the Maricopa County Junior College District, now the Maricopa County Community College District, when the district was formed in 1962. The station moved to its present location at 91.5 MHz in 1966. In 1971, KFCA joined NPR and was approved for a power increase to 100,000 watts from a new tower on South Mountain. On August 24, 1972, soon after signing on from its new, stronger tower, the station changed its calls to KMCR-FM for "Maricopa County Radio". In 1985, the call letters were changed to KJZZ to reflect the jazz musical programming featured by the station.  Within a few years, the station was transferred to the umbrella of Rio Salado College, also in the Maricopa County Community College District, as part of a district reorganization. KJZZ was considered a good fit for Rio Salado College's mission; Rio Salado was conceived as a "campus without walls" and serves as the umbrella for all classes and other academic activities not specifically offered at one of the district's physical campuses.

KJZZ produces several programs, including a weekly call-in talk show, Here and Now, hosted by Phoenix journalist Steve Goldstein which includes calls and e-mails from listeners, not to be confused by the national NPR program of the same name.

In the Spring of 2008, the station produced The Aaron Brown Show, a pilot program hosted by former CNN news anchor Aaron Brown.

Also heard on KJZZ (as well as several other public radio stations in the southwest and Texas) are unique news stories under its program entitled Fronteras: The Changing America Desk. This entity is one part of an initiative of the Corporation for Public Broadcasting (CPB) that created seven Local Journalism Centers (LJCs) to pool the resources of public media stations across the country in FY2009. These LJCs hire their own reporters and editors and concentrate on a specific area.  Fronteras represents the Southwest LJC and focuses primarily on cultural and demographic shifts in the southwest U.S. and stories began airing in 2010.  Other topics heard on Fronteras include immigration and the U.S./Mexico border. According to the CPB, Fronteras' Southwest LJC and the remaining LJCs were expected to become self-sufficient after 2 years.

HD Radio
KJZZ's HD Radio signal is multiplexed. 
HD1 is a digital simulcast of KJZZ's NPR and jazz programming. 
HD2 airs jazz.

Translators

References

External links
KJZZ's official home page includes news, program information, and webcasts
KJZZ's Program Schedule

 

JZZ
NPR member stations
Maricopa County Community College District
Radio stations established in 1951
JZZ (FM)
1951 establishments in Arizona